Batman District (also: Merkez, meaning "central") is a district of Batman Province in Turkey. Its seat is the city of Batman. Its area is 653 km2, and the district had a population of 477,456 in 2021.

Composition
There are two municipalities in Batman District:
 Balpınar
 Batman

There are 33 villages in Batman District:

 Akça
 Akoba
 Bayraklı
 Bıçakçı
 Binatlı
 Çarıklı
 Çayüstü
 Çeşmebaşı
 Çevrimova
 Demirbilek
 Demirlipınar
 Diktepe
 Doluca
 Güneşli
 Güvercin
 Karayün
 Kayabağı
 Kesmeköprü
 Kılıç
 Kocalar
 Kösetarla
 Kuyubaşı 
 Oymataş
 Recepler
 Suçeken
 Urganlı
 Yağmurlu
 Yakıtlı
 Yaylıca
 Yediyol
 Yeşilöz
 Yolağzı
 Yolveren

The district encompasses 32 hamlets.

References 

Districts of Batman Province